Lars Mortimer (22 March 1946 – 25 August 2014) was a Swedish comic artist who wrote and illustrated, among many others, the Swedish comic strips Bobo and Hälge.

Mortimer died after a short illness on 25 August 2014 in Alfta, Hälsingland. He was 68.

References

Swedish cartoonists
Swedish comics artists
1946 births
2014 deaths